Bəylik (also, Beilyar and Beylik) is a village and municipality in the Saatly Rayon of Azerbaijan.  It has a population of 860.

References 

Populated places in Saatly District